The 1951 Men's South American Volleyball Championship, the 1st tournament, took place in 1951 in Rio de Janeiro, Brazil.

Final positions

Mens South American Volleyball Championship, 1951
Men's South American Volleyball Championships
1951 in South American sport
International volleyball competitions hosted by Brazil
1951 in Brazilian sport